Nottingham Elementary School can refer to:
 Nottingham Elementary School (Houston, Texas)
 Nottingham Elementary School (Arlington County, Virginia)
 Nottingham Elementary School (Oxford, Pennsylvania)